There are two major English language computer keyboard layouts, the United States layout and the United Kingdom layout defined in BS 4822 (48-key version). Both are QWERTY layouts. Users in the United States do not frequently need to make use of the £ (pound) and € (euro) currency symbols, which are common needs in the United Kingdom and Ireland, although the $ (dollar sign) symbol is also provided as standard on UK and Irish keyboards. In other countries which predominantly use English as a common working language, such as Australia, Canada (in English-speaking parts, mostly has fallen out of favour and been replaced with the Canadian Multilingual Standard Layout), and New Zealand, the US keyboard is commonly used.

Windows keyboards
The UK variant of the Enhanced keyboard commonly used with personal computers designed for Microsoft Windows differs from the US layout as follows:
 The UK keyboard has 1 more key than the U.S. keyboard (UK=62, US=61, on the typewriter keys, 102 v 101 including function and other keys, 105 vs 104 on models with Windows keys)
 The Alt key to the right of the space bar is replaced by an AltGr key
 The  (pound sign) takes the place vacated by the number sign on the  key
 produces  
 produces  (broken bar, shown as a secondary symbol)

 The  key is moved to the left of the  key ( still produces )
 the Enter key spans two rows, and is narrower to accommodate the #/~ key
 AltGr+vowel produces the acute accent variant of that vowel as needed for Irish. Diacritics used in Scots Gaelic and Welsh require the UK extended keyboard setting.
 Some UK keyboards do not label Backspace, Enter, Tab and Shift in words

Early versions of Windows handled both the differences between the two keyboards and the differences between American English and British English by having two English language options — a UK setting and a US setting. While adequate for users in the United States, United Kingdom, and Ireland, this solution caused difficulty in other English-speaking countries. In many English-speaking jurisdictions (e.g., Canada, Australia, the Caribbean nations, Hong Kong, Malaysia, India, Pakistan, Bangladesh, Singapore, New Zealand, and South Africa), orthography has traditionally conformed more closely to British English usage, while these countries have chosen to use the United States keyboard layout. People in these countries were as a result required to choose a system setting inconsistent with their localised version of English, thereby causing traditional British English to fall out of favour. This is particularly evident with spelling, where words such as "colour" and "centre" are flagged as being spelled incorrectly by word processing software when the operating system is set to the US setting.

However, in more recent editions of Windows, the number of 'settings' options was increased, allowing users to select the correct keyboard and dialect independently. For example, one is given a number of default options for locality that will usually correctly match dialect and keyboard. Further, even if the hardware keyboard layout does not match the region that was pre-selected, it can be changed without changing the regional setting.

International or extended keyboard layouts

Since the standard US keyboard layout in Microsoft Windows offers no way of inputting any sort of diacritic or accent, this makes it unsuitable for all but a handful of languages unless the US International layout is used. The US International layout also uses the right alt (AltGr) as a modifier to enter special characters. 

The equivalent mapping for UK/Irish keyboards is called the "UK Extended" layout which, if activated in settings, will allow the user to enter a wide variety of diacritics (such as grave accents) which are not accommodated by the standard UK/Irish layout. In particular, à,è,ì,ò,ù used in Scots Gaelic can be made (using , release and then the vowel), the ŵ and ŷ used in Welsh (using  (^), release, then  etc.). Likewise, the Spanish and Portuguese letters ñ and õ can be  made (using  (~), release, then  etc). 

For more specialized uses, there is a facility in Windows for users to create a customized layout that may match their needs more precisely.

Apple Macintosh keyboards

The non-standard default U.S. layout on Apple Macintosh computers allows input of diacritical characters, whereby the entire MacRoman character set is directly available.

Apple only supply a custom "British" keyboard layout with major changes from the standard UK layout:
The  and  keys are swapped.
The  symbol is assigned to + instead of the expected +.
The  symbol is assigned to + instead of its own dedicated key.
The  and  symbols have been added.
The U.S. layout follows the ANSI convention of having an enter key in the third row, while the U.K. layout follows ISO and has a stepped double-height key spanning the second and third rows.

MacOS provides support for diacritics using either a "press and hold for pop-up menu" or a more extensive 'dead-key' facility.

Other keyboard layouts

Other operating systems can optionally re-map the keyboard layout or have different modifier keys (for example the Amiga keyboard has "A" modifier keys and BBC Micro or Acorn keyboards often had a "Shift Lock" as well as a "Caps Lock").

Under Unix/Linux the "Windows" key is often called the "Super" key and can be re-mapped by users for specific functionality but in most programs by default does nothing.

Some older Unix/Linux software, such as Emacs, uses the left Alt key as a "Meta" key, which harks back to older MIT or LISP computers.

ChromeOS uses the US and UK Windows layouts, except that the Caps-Lock key is labelled with a "fisheye" (◉) and by default acts as an "everything" search key. (There is an option in Settings to revert it to convention). The function-key row is also differently labelled. The UK-extended layout for ChromeOS is provided by a Chrome add-on, and provides ready access to a substantially greater (than Windows) repertoire of precomposed characters for western, central and eastern European (Latin alphabet) languages.

Dvorak layouts

There are also Dvorak Layouts for each region.

Typewriters

See also
Keyboard layout
Technical standards in Hong Kong

References

Latin-script keyboard layouts
American and British English differences
Computer keyboard types